Kentucky Route 393 (KY 393) is a  state highway in Oldham County, Kentucky, that runs from Kentucky Route 1818 southeast of Centerfield to U.S. Route 42 north of Buckner.

Route description
Its northern terminus is US 42. It then splits south to continue for  where it junctions KY 22 near Centerfield. It follows KY 22 east for  until it splits to the south. There are no low clearances or weight limits on this particular state route. As of 2009, this route has been relocated and improved. From the interchange of Interstate 71, it has been widened to three lanes with a center turn lane. It has been improved to the junction of State Route 22.

Major intersections

References

0393
Transportation in Oldham County, Kentucky